Don Brown is an American author and illustrator of children's books.

Awards and honors 
Sixteen of Brown's books are Junior Library Guild selections: Kid Blink Beats the World (2004), The Good Lion (2005), Bright Path (2006), Teedie (2009), A Wizard from the Start (2010), Gold! Gold from the American River! (2011), Henry and the Cannons (2013), The Great American Dust Bowl (2014), He has Shot the President! (2014), Drowned City (2015),Aaron and Alexander (2016), The Unwanted (2018), Up and Down (2018), Rocket to the Moon (2019), Fever Year: The Killer Flu of 1918 (2020), and In the Shadow of the Fallen Towers (2021).

Many of Brown's books have also been included on lists of the best books of the year. In 2013, Henry and the Cannons was included on School Library Journal's list of the best nonfiction books of the year, and The Great American Dust Bowl was included on lists of the best books of year by Kirkus Reviews and Horn Book. In 2015, Aaron and Alexander was included on School Library Journal's list of the best books of year. Additionally, Drowned City was included on lists of the best books of the year by Booklist, Chicago Public Library, Horn Book Magazine, Kirkus Reviews, New York Public Library, Publishers Weekly, and School Library Journal.  In 2018, Unwanted was included on lists of the best books of the year by Horn Book Magazine, Kirkus Reviews, the New York Public Library, and Shelf Awareness.  In 2019, Rocket to the Moon was on Kirkus Reviews's best books of the year.

Publications

Historical fiction 

 Our Time on the River (2003)
 The Notorious Izzy Fink (2006)
 The Train Jumper (2007)

Nonfiction for older readers 

 Chicago: A Photographic Portrait (2005)
 Distress! All Stations!: April 15, 1912: The Day the Titanic Sank (2008)
 Let it Begin Here!: April 19, 1775: The Day the American Revolution Began (2008)
 America is Under Attack: September 11, 2001: The Day the Towers Fell (2011)
 Gold! Gold from the American River!: January 24, 1848: The Day the Gold Rush Began (2011)
 The Great American Dustbowl (2013)
 He has Shot the President!: April 14, 1865: The Day John Wilkes Booth Killed President Lincoln (2014)
 Drowned City: Hurricane Katrina and New Orleans (2015)
 Older than Dirt: A Wild but True History of Earth with Michael R. Perfit (2017)
 The Unwanted: Stories of the Syrian Refugees (2018)
 Rocket to the Moon (2019)
 Fever Year: The Killer Flu of 1918 (2019)
 Machines that Think (2020)
 A Shot in the Arm (2021)
 In the Shadow of the Fallen Towers: The Seconds, Minutes, Hours, Days, Weeks, Months, and Years after the 9/11 Attacks (2021)

Nonfiction for younger readers 

 Ruth Law Thrills a Nation (1993)
 Alice Ramey's Grand Adventure (1997)
 Rare Treasure: Mary Anning and Her Remarkable Discoveries (1999)
 One Giant Leap: The Story of Neil Armstrong (2001)
 A Voice from the Wilderness: The Story of Anna Howard Shaw (2001)
 Across a Dark & Wild Sea, illustrated by Deborah Nadel (2002)
 Far Beyond the Garden Gate: Alexandra David-Neel's Journey to Lhasa (2002)
 American Boy: The Adventures of Mark Twain (2003)
 Mack Made Movies (2003)
 Uncommon Traveler: Mary Kingsley in Africa (2003)
 Kid Blink Beats the World (2004)
 Odd Boy Out: Young Albert Einstein (2004)
 The Good Lion, written by Beryl Markham (2005)
 Bright Path: Young Jim Thorpe (2006)
 Dolley Madison Saves George Washington (2007)
 Teedie: The Story of Young Teddy Roosevelt (2008)
 A Kid's Guide to Chicago, written by Karen Bartlett (2010)
 A Wizard from the Start: The Incredible Boyhood and Amazing Inventions of Thomas Edison (2010)
 The Boy Who Went to Bed Round and Woke Up Square by Evan Rothman (2011)
 Henry & the Cannons: An Extraordinary True Story of the American Revolution (2013)
 Aaron & Alexander: The Most Famous Duel in American History (2015)
 Up & Down: The Adventures of John Jeffries, First American to Fly (2018)

References

External links 

 Official website

American children's book illustrators